Henri Pleger (25 October 1898 – 5 July 1982) was a Luxembourgian athlete. He competed in the men's long jump and the men's high jump at the 1920 Summer Olympics.

References

1898 births
1982 deaths
Athletes (track and field) at the 1920 Summer Olympics
Luxembourgian male long jumpers
Luxembourgian male high jumpers
Olympic athletes of Luxembourg
Place of birth missing